The KOMDIV-64 is a family of 64-bit microprocessors developed by the Scientific Research Institute of System Development (NIISI) of the Russian Academy of Sciences and manufactured by TSMC, UMC, GlobalFoundries, and X-Fab. The KOMDIV-64 processors are primarily intended for industrial and high-performance computing applications.  

These microprocessors implement the MIPS IV instruction set architecture (ISA).

Overview

Nomenclature 
Many microprocessors listed here are following version 2000 of the soviet integrated circuit designation.

Details

1990VM3T
0.35 μm CMOS process
240-pin QFP

1890VM5F
0.35 μm CMOS process
16 KB L1 instruction cache, 16 KB L1 data cache, 256 KB L2 cache
in-order, dual-issue superscalar; 5-stage integer pipeline, 7-stage floating point pipeline
26.6 million transistors
compatible with PMC-Sierra RM7000
performance: 0.68 dhrystones/MHz, 1.03 whetstones/MHz, 1.09 coremarks/MHz

1890VM6Ya
0.18 μm CMOS process
16 KB L1 instruction cache, 16 KB L1 data cache, 256 KB L2 cache
680-pin BGA
System-on-a-chip (SoC) including a PCI controller, 5 64-bit timers, RapidIO, Ethernet 100/10 Mbit/s, USB 2.0, I²C
performance: 0.90 dhrystones/MHz, 1.32 whetstones/MHz, 1.47 coremarks/MHz

1890VM7Ya
0.18 μm CMOS process
16 KB L1 instruction cache, 16 KB L1 data cache, 32 KB general-purpose SRAM
680-pin BGA
System-on-a-chip (SoC) including a PCI controller, 3 64-bit timers, RapidIO, I²C, SPI, 128-bit DSP with 4 cores and 64 KB RAM per core

1890VM8Ya
65 nm CMOS process; manufactured at TSMC
32 KB L1 instruction cache, 16 KB L1 data cache, 512 KB L2 cache
1294-pin BGA
System-on-a-chip (SoC) including a PCI controller, 5 64-bit timers, RapidIO, Ethernet 1000/100/10 Mbit/s, USB 2.0, I²C, SPI, SATA 3.0

1890VM9Ya
65 nm CMOS process; manufactured at TSMC
1294-pin BGA
System-on-a-chip (SoC) including RapidIO, Ethernet 1000 Mbit/s, USB 2.0, SATA 3.0
power consumption 12 W, temperature range -60 °C to +85 °C

1890VM108
65 nm CMOS process; manufactured at TSMC
32 KB L1 instruction cache, 16 KB L1 data cache, 512 KB L2 cache
System-on-a-chip (SoC) including a PCI controller, Ethernet 1000/100/10 Mbit/s, USB 2.0, I²C, SPI, CAN 2.0, SATA 3.0
power consumption 7 W, temperature range -60 °C to +85 °C

1890VM118
28 nm CMOS process; manufactured at TSMC
System-on-a-chip (SoC) including a PCI controller, Ethernet 1000/100/10 Mbit/s, USB 2.0, I²C, SPI, CAN 2.0, SATA 3.0, graphics co-processor
power consumption 9 W, temperature range -60 °C to +85 °C

1890VM128
65 nm CMOS process; manufactured at TSMC
System-on-a-chip (SoC) including a PCI controller, Ethernet 1000/100/10 Mbit/s, USB 2.0, I²C, SPI, graphics co-processor
power consumption 20 W, temperature range -60 °C to +85 °C

1907VM028
0.25 μm Silicon on Insulator (SOI) CMOS process; manufacturing to be moved to Mikron Group
128 KB L2 cache
675-pin BGA
System-on-a-chip (SoC) including RapidIO, Ethernet, PCI, I²C

K5500VK018
65 nm CMOS process; contains only Russian IP blocks
128 KB L2 cache
265-pin BGA
System-on-a-chip (SoC) including Ethernet 100/10 Mbit/s, USB 2.0, I²C, SPI, CAN 2.0, SDIO, 8-channel ADC, 4-channel DAC, RTC
power consumption 0.5 W, temperature range -40 °C to +85 °C

See also
 KOMDIV-32

References

64-bit microprocessors
MIPS implementations